Gisela Dulko and Flavia Pennetta were the defending champions, but were knocked out in the semifinals by Liezel Huber and Lisa Raymond.

Huber and Raymond won the title because their opponents Victoria Azarenka and Maria Kirilenko withdrew before the final match (due to Azarenka's right hand injury ).

Seeds
The top four seeds received a bye into the second round.

Draw

Finals

Top half

Bottom half

References

Main Draw

Rogers Cup Doubles
2011 Rogers Cup
Rogers